The roughskin dogfish (Centroscymnus owstonii) is a sleeper shark of the family Somniosidae, found around the world on continental shelves in tropical, subtropical and temperate seas, at depths of between 100 and 1,500 m.  It reaches a length of 121 cm.

Conservation status 
The New Zealand Department of Conservation has classified the roughskin dogfish as "Not Threatened" under the New Zealand Threat Classification System.

References

roughskin dogfish
Fauna of the Southeastern United States
Fish of Uruguay
roughskin dogfish